Turris bipartita is a species of sea snail, a marine gastropod mollusk in the family Turridae, the turrids.

Description
The length of the shell varies between 20 mm and 31 mm

Distribution
This marine species occurs off India

References

 Kilburn R.N., Fedosov A.E. & Olivera B.M. (2012) Revision of the genus Turris Batsch, 1789 (Gastropoda: Conoidea: Turridae) with the description of six new species. Zootaxa 3244: 1-58.

External links
 Kiener L.C. 1839-1842. Spécies général et iconographie des coquilles vivantes. Vol. 5. Famille des Canalifères. Première partie. Genres Cérite (Cerithium), Adanson, pp. 1-104, pl. 1-32
 Deshayes, G. P. (1832-1833). Mollusques. In: Bélanger, C. (ed.) Voyage aux Indes-Orientales, par le nord de l'Europe, les provinces du Caucase, la Géorgie, l'Arménie et la Perse, suivi de détails topographiques, statistiques et autres sur le Pégou, les îles de Java, de Maurice et de Bourbon, sur le Cap-de-Bonne-Espérance et Sainte-Hélène, pendant les années 1825, 1826, 1827, 1828 et 1829. Volume 2, Zoologie. pp. 403-440, 3 pl

bipartita
Gastropods described in 2012